The 2023 AFC U-17 Asian Cup will be the 19th edition of the AFC U-17 Asian Cup (including previous editions of the AFC U-16 Championship and AFC U-17 Championship), the biennial international youth football championship organised by the Asian Football Confederation (AFC) for the men's under-17 national teams of Asia. This edition will be the first since 2006 to be played as an under-17 tournament, as the AFC proposed to switch the tournament from under-16 to under-17 starting from 2023. Moreover, the tournament was also rebranded from the "AFC U-16 Championship" to the "AFC U-17 Asian Cup".

On 25 January 2021, the AFC announced that Bahrain would retain hosting rights for the 2023 edition after the cancellation of the 2020 AFC U-16 Championship due to the COVID-19 pandemic. However, Bahrain decided to withdraw the rights to host the competition on 16 June 2022, requiring a new host to be chosen at a later date. On 23 December 2022, Thailand were recommended the hosting rights, in which the final decision will be ratified by the AFC Executive Committee.

A total of 16 teams will play in the tournament. The top four teams of the tournament will qualify for the 2023 FIFA U-17 World Cup in Peru as the AFC representatives.

Japan are the title holders, having won the title in 2018.

Qualification

Qualification matches were played between 1–9 October 2022.

Qualified teams
A total of  16 teams including hosts qualified for the final tournament. Bahrain, Indonesia, Oman, United Arab Emirates and North Korea (the latter of which did not enter qualifying) all missed out on this edition after initially qualifying for the previous edition. Furthermore, Afghanistan, Laos, Malaysia, Thailand and Vietnam all qualified for this edition after initially missing out.

Venues

Match officials

Draw 
The 16 teams are to be drawn into four groups of four teams, with the teams seeded according to their performance in the 2018 AFC U-16 Championship final tournament and qualification, with the potential hosts Thailand automatically seeded and assigned to Position A1 in the draw. The draw is set to take place on 30 March 2023 in Bangkok, Thailand.

Squads

Group stage 
The group winners and runners-up advance to the quarter-finals.

Tiebreakers
Teams are to be ranked according to points (3 points for a win, 1 point for a draw, 0 points for a loss), and if tied on points, the following tie-breaking criteria were applied, in the order given, to determine the rankings:
Points in head-to-head matches among tied teams;
Goal difference in head-to-head matches among tied teams;
Goals scored in head-to-head matches among tied teams;
If more than two teams are tied, and after applying all head-to-head criteria above, a subset of teams are still tied, all head-to-head criteria above are reapplied exclusively to this subset of teams;
Goal difference in all group matches;
Goals scored in all group matches;
Penalty shoot-out if only two teams were tied and they met in the last round of the group;
Disciplinary points (yellow card = 1 point, red card as a result of two yellow cards = 3 points, direct red card = 3 points, yellow card followed by direct red card = 4 points);
Drawing of lots.

All match times are in local time, ICT (UTC+7).

Group A

Group B

Group C

Group D

Qualified teams for FIFA U-17 World Cup
The following four teams from AFC qualified for the 2023 FIFA U-17 World Cup.

1 Bold indicates champions for that year. Italic indicates hosts for that year.

See also
2023 AFC U-20 Asian Cup

References

 
U-17 Asian Cup
2023 in youth association football
2023 FIFA U-17 World Cup qualification
Scheduled association football competitions
AFC